Garikipati Narasimha Rao is an Indian Telugu Avadhani (literary performer) from Andhra Pradesh, India. Avadhanis are respected for their abilities to spin out verses conforming to Telugu grammar on literally any subject that audience may throw at them, as a challenge. In 1996 he performed Avadhanam with 1116 Pruchchakas or Pricchakas for 21 days in Kakinada. He also delivers lectures on personality development based on Dharmic culture and way of life. He regularly appears on Telugu TV channels like SVBC, Bhakti TV, and ABN Andhra Jyothi giving discourses on Ancient Hindu texts like Bhagavadgita Balavikaasam, Ramayana, and Mahabharata. In 2022, he was awarded India's fourth-highest civilian award Padma Shri by the government of India.

Personal life 
Rao was born on 14 September 1958 to the couple Venkata Surya Narayana and Venkata Ramanamma. He married Sarada who is from East Godavari, Annavaram. He named his two sons Sri Sri and Gurajada. His elder son  was named after great telugu poet Srirangam Srinivasarao, has completed his Hotel management and working as a General manager. His younger son Gurajada who was named after great Telugu poet Gurajada Apparao, has pursued his Master's, M.Phil. and PhD in Telugu at university of Hyderabad. As a motivational and spiritual speaker, Dr. Gurajada has delivered over 200 lectures across Telugu states.

Career
Rao started performing Avadhanams in the year 1972. He has conducted more than 288 avadhanams, including Dvigunita Avadhanam at Dallas for the American Telugu Association in 2002. Rao is known for his Dhāraṇā (memorising and reciting), which is a key requirement for performing Avadhanams.

On 26 November 2018, while at Koti Deepotsavam Stage, Rao emotionally announced that very soon he will retire from discoursing pravachanams and public speeches after completing already accepted projects, in order to attain inner peace and enlightenment but later he changed his decision per public requests and to help and activate the society through his way of speeches.

Literary works
 Sagara Ghosha (Padya Kavyam)
 Mana Bharatam (padya kavyam )
 Bashpa guccham (padya kavita samputi)
 pallavi (songs)
 Mahasahasravadhanam
 Dwi satavadhanam
 Dharadharana
 Kavitakhandika satavadhanam
 Moukhika sahityam (parisodhana)
 Pillala bommala Telugu nighantuvu
 Maa Amma (padyalu)
 Avadhana satakam (2 Vol)
 Vaikunthapali
 Ishta Daivam
 Vyaktitva Deepam
 Ocean Blues (English version of Sagara Ghosha

Awards 

 He received Loknayak Foundation Award on 18 January 2016.
 "Gurajada Samskritika Samakhya", a literary organization honored him with "Gurajada Visishta Puraskar" in November 2016.
 Ramineni Foundation Awards in 2018.
 Padma Shri in 2022.

References 

1958 births
Living people
People from West Godavari district
Telugu writers
Television personalities from Andhra Pradesh
Recipients of the Padma Shri in literature & education
Telugu poets
Indian Hindus